Neria is a Zimbabwean film made in 1991, written by the novelist Tsitsi Dangarembga. It is directed by Godwin Mawuru and the screenplay was written by Louise Riber. It is the highest-grossing film in Zimbabwean history.

The film concerns the struggles of a woman in a suburb of the capital; Harare, Warren Park, in Zimbabwe when she is widowed after her husband is killed in an accident. Her husband's older brother takes advantage of the death of his younger brother, and uses the inheritance for self-benefit at the expense of Neria and her two children. Its soundtrack, Neria remains one of the most celebrated Zimbabwean songs. The soundtrack of the film was sung by Oliver Mtukudzi.

Plot
Harare, 1990. Neria and Patrick, a married couple, both work and earn money in the city and live a modern egalitarian lifestyle. But when Patrick is killed in an accident, his family uses traditional Shona custom to deprive Neria of her property and children.The film starts showing Neria and Patrick enjoying a modern life in the city with their two children. The couple goes to visit their family in the rural where they are persuaded by Patrick's mother to stay home rather than in the suburbs away from the rest of the family. Patrick objects stating that he and Neria have built a home in the suburb and their life belongs there. Back in the city, Patrick's car refuses to start as he wants to go to work, he then uses the bicycle instead. On his way from work his bicycle is hit by a truck and he dies on the spot.

Local Acclaim
The film is loved by Zimbabweans as they feel it is one of the few depictions of local living experiences and struggles on the big screen. There is yet to be a production that will rival Neria in this way.

Cast
Anthony Chinyanga (Mr. Chigwanzi)
Dominic Kanaventi (Phineas)
Claude Maredza (Mr. Machacha)
Emmanuel Mbrirmi (Patrick)
Jesese Mungoshi (Neria)
Violet Ndlovu (Ambuya)
Sharon Malujlo (Canadian Tourist)
Oliver Mtukudzi (Jethro)
Kubi Indi (Connie)
Garikai Mudzamiri

Release
Neria was released in 1991. The VHS went on sale in July 1992.

Neria won the Best Soundtrack award from South African station M-Net in 1992.

Neria was released in the United States in 1993, which is why it is sometimes erroneously given the date of 1993. The Chicago Tribune gave it two and a half stars.

References

External links

Neria on YouTube

1991 films
Zimbabwean drama films
Films shot in Zimbabwe
1990s feminist films
Films set in 1990
1990s English-language films
Films by Tsitsi Dangarembga